Judith Louise Jackson (born 31 August 1947 in ) is an Australian former Labor Party politician, in Tasmania from 1986 to 2006. She was the first female attorney-general of Tasmania and also served as the Minister for Environment in the Tasmanian Government. During her time in parliament, she was a member of the Hobart-based seat of Denison.

Political career

Before her entry into parliament, Jackson graduate from the University of Tasmania with a Bachelor of Arts, Diploma of Education and Bachelor of Laws. Jackson commenced work as a school teacher. She entered parliament in 1986, despite not coming from a union or political family. She held a number of portfolios including; Minister for Community Services (1989), Minister for Roads and Transport (1991), Shadow Attorney-General (1996–1998) and Minister for Health and Human Services. Jackson is a committed feminist and has worked tirelessly to bring equal opportunity to women in Tasmania. As Attorney-General, Jackson drafted several laws including The Family Violence Act which outlawed domestic violence in Tasmania and the Relationships Act which made it possible for non-married (including homosexual) couples to register a union and obtain similar rights as married couples.

Criticism

Jackson had many critics; the Risdon prison siege in 2005 caused much controversy and she was widely blamed as not handling the situation.

In 2005 the Family Violence Act she drafted was criticised by judges as one of the provisions in the legislation prevented courts from granting bail to alleged domestic violence offenders, as well as the points system used discriminating against people of different ethnic or lower socio-economic backgrounds. However Jackson remained firm about the issue and the legislation was introduced, unchanged.

In 2005 the government also drafted the Sex Regulation Act which sought to further legalise and regulate prostitution. Under the legislation, brothels in Tasmania would be legal and could be owned by any individual except convicted criminals, patrons of prostitution would be required by law to wear a condom. However Jackson was unable to convince the community and members of the Tasmanian Legislative Council rejected her bill. As a result, she made a back flip; abandoning her legislation and banning brothels in Tasmania. Jackson faced criticism from both sides; sex workers and supporters fearing that prostitution will go underground and others for supporting prostitution in the first place. Jackson, in a statement, revealed how she felt that regulation of the industry was better than banning it altogether.

As Environment Minister she was highly criticised by the Tasmanian Greens for inaction over the  devil facial tumour disease, a transmissible cancer that occurs in Tasmanian devils.

Retirement

In 2005, Jackson announced she would not contest her seat during the 2006 state election and retired when her term ended on 17 March 2006.

Recognition and awards
In 2009 Jackson was inducted to the Tasmanian Honour Roll of Women for service to Government and to Human Rights.

References

External links
 Judy Jackon's maiden speech to parliament
 

Living people
1947 births
Members of the Tasmanian House of Assembly
Australian Labor Party members of the Parliament of Tasmania
21st-century Australian politicians
21st-century Australian women politicians
Women members of the Tasmanian House of Assembly
University of Tasmania alumni